John Joseph Hinchion (1926 – 13 March 2015) was an Irish Gaelic footballer who played for club sides Macroom, Millstreet and Canovee, as well as at senior level for the Cork county team. He lined out in both attack and defence.

Career
Hinchion began his Gaelic football career with the Macroom minor team before winning a County Senior Championship medal with Millstreet in 1948. He subsequently joined the Canovee team, winning a County Junior Championship title in 1950. This victory resulted in Hinchion taking over the captaincy of the Cork junior team in 1951, ending the year with an All-Ireland- medal in that grade. This success saw him drafted onto the senior team and he won National League and Munster Championship medals in his debut season. Henchion won a second Munster Championship medal in 1957; however, the ultimate success eluded him after Cork's 1–09 to 1–07 defeat by Louth in the All-Ireland final.

Personal life and death
Hinchion began his working life in the drapery business before opening an auctioneering business in Macroom. He died on 13 March 2015.

Honours
Millstreet
Cork Senior Football Championship: 1948

Canovee
Cork Junior Football Championship: 1950

Cork
Munster Senior Football Championship: 1952, 1957
National Football League: 1951-52
All-Ireland Junior Football Championship: 1951 (c)
Munster Junior Football Championship: 1951 (c)

References

1926 births
2015 deaths
Canovee Gaelic footballers
Cork inter-county Gaelic footballers
Drapers
Irish auctioneers
Macroom Gaelic footballers
Millstreet Gaelic footballers
Gaelic games players from County Cork